Louis Venant Gabriel Le Bailly de La Falaise (1866 in Luçon – 1910 in Paris) was a French fencer. He participated in Fencing at the 1900 Summer Olympics in Paris and won the gold medal in the sabre, defeating fellow French fencer Henri Masson in the final. He also participated in Fencing at the 1908 Summer Olympics but was beaten in the final round, finishing in last place.

By his wife, the former Henriette Hennessy, he had four children:
 Louise Le Bailly de La Falaise, (1894-1910)
 James Henry Le Bailly de La Falaise, 1898–1972), who married American movie stars Gloria Swanson and Constance Bennett
 Alain Le Bailly de La Falaise, (1905–1977), first husband of model Maxime de la Falaise and father of fashion muse/designer Loulou de la Falaise
 Richard Le Bailly de La Falaise, (1910–1945)

References

External links
 

1866 births
1910 deaths
French male épée fencers
Olympic fencers of France
Olympic gold medalists for France
Olympic medalists in fencing
Medalists at the 1900 Summer Olympics
Medalists at the 1906 Intercalated Games
Fencers at the 1900 Summer Olympics
Fencers at the 1906 Intercalated Games
Fencers at the 1908 Summer Olympics
French nobility
People from Luçon
Sportspeople from Vendée
Le Bailly de La Falaise family
French male foil fencers
20th-century French people